"Gettin' Hungry" is a song by American rock band the Beach Boys from their 1967 album Smiley Smile. Credited on the label to Brian Wilson and Mike Love, it was released as a single on August 28, 1967, the second and last released on the original iteration of Brother Records.

Background
Asked for comment, Wilson said that he "just thought it would be a good single". It is one of the few songs on Smiley Smile that lack a definite connection to the aborted Smile project.

Recording
"Gettin' Hungry" was recorded at Brian Wilson's Bellagio home studio on July 14, 1967.

Reception
Billboard reviewed "Gettin' Hungry" as an "unusual piece of material — as off-beat as their current 'Heroes and Villains' smash. Should prove to be an important chart item."  Cash Box said that the "use of abrupt changes of speed, overwhelming organ atmosphere and the sort of 'soul' sound that is Beach Boys" make the song "distinctive." 

Among biographers, Byron Preiss characterized it as "an odd combination of energetic chorus, electric bass, and bluesy meandering". Mark Dillon noted the song as a "flop single".

Cover versions

1979 – Celebration, Celebration
1974 – The Faces
2012 – Keith Haman - from the album Total Electric
2013 – Seth Mankowski, Portland Sings The Beach Boys "Smiley Smile"

References

External links
 

1967 singles
The Beach Boys songs
Songs written by Brian Wilson
Songs written by Mike Love
Capitol Records singles
1967 songs
American soul songs
Rhythm and blues songs
Song recordings produced by the Beach Boys